Speculum Sophicum Rhodostauroticum ("The Mirror of the Wisdom of the Rosy Cross") is an early text of Rosicrucianism, published in 1618 by the pseudonymous "Theophilus Schweighardt Constantiens", believed to be Daniel Mögling (1596–1635), an alchemist, physician and astronomer.

See also
Esotericism
Hermeticism

References
 Susanna Åkerman, Rose cross over the Baltic: the spread of rosicrucianism in Northern Europe, Brill's studies in intellectual history 87, Brill Publishers, 1998, p. 216
 Johannes Kepler (tr. & ed. Edward Rosen), Kepler's somnium: the dream, or posthumous work on lunar astronomy, Dover Publications, 2003, p. 184
 William R. Newman and Anthony Grafton (eds.), Secrets of nature: astrology and alchemy in early modern Europe, Transformations: Studies in the History of Science and Technology, MIT Press, 2001, p. 301

External links
Rosie: Speculum Sophicum Rhodo-Stauroticum
The Alchemy website: Speculum sophicum rhodostauroticum
University College of London: Rosicrucian text

1618 works
17th-century documents
Rosicrucianism